Christophe Mboso N'Kodia Pwanga is a Congolese politician who is the current President of the National Assembly.

Career 
Born in 1942, he graduated in 1972 with a bachelor's degree in political and administrative sciences from the University of Lubumbashi. In February 2021, he was elected as the President of the National Assembly following an election in which he received 389 votes out of 460. He succeeds Jeannine Mabunda who was dismissed on 10 December 2020.

See also 
 Évariste Boshab
 Jeannine Mabunda
 Gabriel Kyungu wa Kumwanza

References

Living people
1942 births
Presidents of the National Assembly (Democratic Republic of the Congo)
21st-century Democratic Republic of the Congo people